Renan Cardoso Domingues (born August 25, 1988 in Salgado de São Félix), is a Brazilian midfielder. He currently plays for Galícia.

Honours
Best player: Bahia State League (U-20) 2007

Contract
1 July 2007 to 30 July 2010

External links
Galícia E.C. Official Site
CBF

1988 births
Living people
Brazilian footballers
Galícia Esporte Clube players
Association football midfielders